Macau University of Science and Technology Hospital (MUST Hospital), is one of three hospitals in Macau. The hospital is located in the Cotai area of Macau. Opened in 2006, it is run by the Macau University of Science and Technology Foundation.

The hospital focuses on both Chinese and Western medicine, and is associated with the foundation. The hospital is also a teaching hospital for the first medical school that was established in Macau in 2019 at the Macau University of Science and Technology.

Currently the hospital is not engaged in international healthcare accreditation.

Departments and Services

 Chinese Medicine Department
 Western Medicine Department
 Sleep Disorder Management Centre
 Executive Health Management Centre
 International Medical Service
 Specialist Center of Chinese Medicine Faculty
 Clinical Laboratory Diagnostic Centre
 Endoscopy Centre
 Medical Imaging Diagnostic Centre
 Integrated Rehabilitation Service Centre
 Integrated Chinese and Western Medicine Oncology Treatment Service
 “Zhi Wei Bing” (Preventive Medicine)

Transport

Bus
The hospital is served by two bus stops: "Wai Long / M.U.S.T-Hospital" and "Rotunda do Aeroporto / Wai Long".

Wai Long / M.U.S.T-Hospital:
26
36
51A
AP1
MT1
N2
N5
N6

Rotunda do Aeroporto / Wai Long:
26
51A
MT1
N2
N5

Cars
There is a car park in front of the hospital.

Shuttle
The hospital offers a shuttle to Nam Van (in front of ) from 9:30 to 20:30.

See also
Healthcare in Macau
List of hospitals in Macau
List of hospitals in China

References

External links

 Link to University Hospital's website
  MUST article mentioning the opening of MUST Hospital
 

Hospital buildings completed in 2006
Hospitals in Macau
Hospitals established in 2006
2006 establishments in Macau
Cotai